WKUG-LP, UHF analog channel 62, was a low-powered TBN-affiliated television station licensed to Glasgow, Kentucky, United States.

History
The station signed on the air in 2002 as an owned-and-operated translator of the Trinity Broadcasting Network (TBN) programming on the translator was delivered via satellite from TBN's national feed originating from flagship KTBN-TV in Santa Ana, California. The Glasgow area was also served by W60DG (now WKUW-LP, originally on channel 60) from 2002 until 2010. In 2007, TBN took WKUG silent before selling the station to Budd Broadcasting. WKUT-LP, which began broadcasting on analog UHF channel 64, replaced WKUG as a TBN station, making TBN available to Glasgow for an additional three years at the very least until it, too, went off the air in 2010 after Budd Broadcasting purchased that station. The shutdowns of both translators were due to lack of financial support, and the limited signal coverage areas. On June 18, 2008, the FCC deleted WKUG's license and files. In 2009, the station attempted to file an application to return to the air as a digital station, but failed to sign on at any-time, so those applications were deleted on February 3, 2010.

Post-existence
DTV America Corporation of Sunrise, Florida purchased WKUT in 2014, but sold it, along with WKUW, to HC2 Holdings. WKUT has been relocated to Elizabethtown, meaning it will serve the southern portions of the Louisville media market when it returns to the air. In the early 2010s, WKUW was relocated to White House, Tennessee, and then became a Buzzr affiliate serving the Nashville area in December 2015; it is currently a beIN Sports Xtra affiliate as of 2022. HC2 Holdings (now INNOVATE Corp.) also relocated WKUT-LD to another neighboring market; it is currently an Azteca America affiliate serving parts of the Louisville market. 

For all intents and purposes, full-powered TBN O&O station WPGD-TV of Hendersonville, Tennessee, located within the Nashville media market, is currently the default over-the-air TBN station, affiliate or O&O, in the Bowling Green area as that station is the closest TBN station. Subscribers of Dish Network, DirecTV, and the local cable systems, on the other hand, provides the TBN national feed, along with the feeds of TBN's sister networks (e.g. Hillsong Channel, JUCE TV, Smile of a Child, and TBN Enlace USA). Bowling Green never had another religious network available from a local outlet until August 2016, when WCZU-LD launched their fourth digital subchannel to carry the Sonlife Broadcasting Network. That subchannel, along with Scottsville-licensed independent station WPBM-CD are the only two locally based religious stations in the area.

References

External links
TBN website

KUG-LD
Television channels and stations established in 2002
Television channels and stations disestablished in 2007
Defunct television stations in the United States
2002 establishments in Kentucky
2007 disestablishments in Kentucky
KUG-LP
Glasgow, Kentucky